Alexandre Texier (born 13 September 1999) is a French professional ice hockey forward for the ZSC Lions of the National League (NL) on loan from the Columbus Blue Jackets of the National Hockey League (NHL). Texier started his career with Brûleurs de loups de Grenoble in the French Ligue Magnus, winning the Coupe de France in 2017 and earning the Jean-Pierre Graff Trophy as best young player in the French League.

He was selected by the Blue Jackets in the 2nd Round, 45th overall in the 2017 NHL Entry Draft, the first player drafted directly out of the French league. He then spent two seasons with Finish Liiga side KalPa, with whom he won the 2018 edition of the Spengler Cup. he moved to North America and made his NHL debut in 2019. Internationally Texier has represented France at the junior and senior level.

Playing career
Texier grew up playing for Brûleurs de Loups in Grenoble, France, the same club his father Fabrice played for from 1989 until 1992. A rookie in the Ligue Magnus in 2016–17, he was awarded the Jean-Pierre Graff Trophy as the best first-year player.

The National Hockey League (NHL) Central Scouting, which ranks players eligible for the annual Entry Draft, had Texier as the 16th best European skater prior to the 2017 NHL Entry Draft. He was ultimately selected in the second round, 45th overall by the Columbus Blue Jackets, becoming the first player drafted directly out of France. After the draft Texier, who was also selected 17th in the CHL Import Draft by the Baie-Comeau Drakkar of the Quebec Major Junior Hockey League, moved to KalPa of the Finnish Liiga for the 2017–18 season. The team's youngest player, he scored 13 goals and 22 points in 53 games. On 23 May 2018, after the conclusion of the season, Texier was signed to a three-year, entry-level contract by the Blue Jackets, who then let him spend a second season in Finland.

After his second season with Kalpa, in which he led the team with 41 points in 55 games, Texier was assigned to the Blue Jackets' American Hockey League (AHL) affiliate, the Cleveland Monsters. He played seven games for the Monsters, scoring seven points, before the Blue Jackets recalled him. Texier made his NHL debut on 5 April 2019 against the New York Rangers. He scored his first NHL goal the following night against the Ottawa Senators in the team's final regular season game. He scored his first playoff goal against the Tampa Bay Lightning in game four of the Blue Jackets first-round playoff series on 16 April.

During his first full season in the NHL, Texier suffered a lumbar stress fracture that limited him to playing in only 36 games played during the 2019–20 season. Texier finished with 6 goals and 7 assists in the regular season. Returning to the Blue Jackets for the NHL's return-to-play and playoffs, Texier registered four assists in 10 post-season games.

With the following 2020–21 NHL season delayed due to the COVID-19 pandemic, Texier was originally loaned to join former Finnish club, KalPa, on 8 September 2020. Due to personal reasons, he opted to cancel his loan and return on loan to hometown club Brûleurs de Loups of the Ligue Magnus until the resumption of the NHL on 5 October 2020.

International play
Texier has played internationally for France at the junior and senior level. At the 2017 U-18 World Championship he helped the French under-18 win the tournament, earning promotion to the elite division for the first time in their history. Texier recorded five points in five games, and was named the tournament's top forward.

He was expected to make his debut for the senior team at the 2017 World Championship, which was co-hosted in Paris and Cologne, Germany, but a shoulder-injury kept him out. He played the following year for the national team at the 2018 World Championship, becoming the third-youngest player in the tournament. He joined the French national team for the 2019 IIHF World Championship and got relegated to Division I A as France lost all of its 7 games.

Personal life
Texier's father, Fabrice, was also a hockey player, and introduced his son to the sport. Fabrice played four games in the 1986–87 season with the Laval Titan, spending the rest of his career in France, mainly with the Brûleurs de Loups.

Career statistics

Regular season and playoffs

International

Awards and honours

References

External links
 

1999 births
Living people
Brûleurs de Loups players
Cleveland Monsters players
Columbus Blue Jackets draft picks
Columbus Blue Jackets players
French ice hockey forwards
KalPa players
Sportspeople from Grenoble
ZSC Lions players